This is a list of monuments in Bardiya District, Nepal as officially recognized by and available through the website of the Department of Archaeology, Nepal.

|}

See also 
 List of monuments in Lumbini Province
 List of monuments in Nepal

References 

Bardiya